Otto Baumbach (1882-1966) was the glassblower who built part of the apparatus used by Ernest Rutherford and colleagues in the famous Gold foil experiment. In fact, this experiment has been referred to as the Rutherford-Royds-Baumbach experiment:

It was Baumbach's ability to blow, "fine tubes very uniform in thickness." which led to him being key to Rutherford's work. In fact, such was Baumbach's skill that he was involved in many important experiments and acknowledged on some of the associated publications.

Personal life 
Gottlob Otto Baumbach was born on 10 September 1882 in Niederwilligen, Germany. He studied at the Thüringische Landesfachschule für Glasinstrumententechnik in Ilmenau (Thuringia School for Glass Instrument Technology).

He died in 1966, at the age of 84, in Alkrington, UK.

Career 
Baumbach started working at the University of Manchester at some time in the early 1900s and certainly before 1905 when an article, published in May that year, stated:

He had an independent business selling glassware and building equipment. He supplied Robert Falcon Scott with sample tubes for his 1910 Terra Nova Antarctic Expedition.

After the First World War, he began trading as J.C.Cowlishaw and this business was incorporated in 1925 and continued until it was officially wound-up in 1982.

References 

19th-century British scientists
1882 births
Glassblowers
19th-century German people
1966 deaths
German emigrants to the United Kingdom